The FG-46 (a.k.a. EPKM and SpaB-170) is a Chinese spin stabilized solid rocket motor burning HTPB. It was developed by China Hexi Chemical and Machinery Corporation (also known as the 6th Academy of CASIC) for use in the Long March 2E on GTO missions. It first flew as a prototype SPTS-M14 on July 16, 1990 on the Badr A mission. It had its first commercial mission orbiting the AsiaSat 2 on November 28, 1995 and exactly one month later, on December 28 its second and last mission for EchoStar 1.

References

Rocket engines of China
Solid-fuel rockets